The men's singles tennis event at the 2015 Summer Universiade was held from July 4 to 12 at the Jawol International Tennis Court in Gwangju, South Korea.

Chung Hyeon of South Korea won the gold medal, defeating Aslan Karatsev of Russia in the final, 1–6, 6–2, 6–0.

Lucas Poullain of France and Yang Tsung-hua of Chinese Taipei won the bronze medals.

Seeds
All sixteen seeds receive a bye into the second round.

Main draw

Finals

Top half

Section 1

Section 2

Section 3

Section 4

Bottom half

Section 5

Section 6

Section 7

Section 8

Consolation draw

Consolation finals

Top half

Bottom half

References
Main Draw

Tennis at the 2015 Summer Universiade